Broken Side of Time is a drama by Gorman Bechard, part two of his Alone Trilogy that began with his 2005 feature, "You Are Alone." It made its film festival debut in June 2013.

The film was released on DVD on May 20, 2014 by MVD Entertainment.  It is also streaming on Hulu  and Amazon.com.

Release
Film screenings included the following:
 New York, New York - VisionFest, June 28, 2013
 Bay City, MI - Hell's Half Mile Film & Music Festival, June 28, 2013
 Northampton, MA - Northampton International Film Festival, October 12, 2013
 Cleveland, Ohio - Ohio Independent Film Festival, November 9, 2013
 New York, New York - CineKink Festival, March 1, 2014

Awards
 New York, New York - The Abe Schrager Award for Cinematography: Gorman Bechard, VisionFest, June 28, 2013
 Bay City, MI - Best Lead Actress: Lynn Mancinelli, Hell's Half Mile Film & Music Festival, June 28, 2013
 New York, New York - Audience Choice for Best Narrative Feature, CineKink, March 2, 2014

References

External links
 
 

2013 drama films
Films directed by Gorman Bechard
Films about depression
Films about modeling
Films about photographers
Films about sexuality
American independent films
2013 independent films
2013 films
2010s English-language films
2010s American films